The 1979 All-Ireland Senior Camogie Championship Final was the 48th All-Ireland Final and the deciding match of the 1979 All-Ireland Senior Camogie Championship, an inter-county camogie tournament for the top teams in Ireland.

Tipperary led 1–1 to 0–2 at half-time, but Antrim powered past them to win a low-scoring but exciting final.

References

All-Ireland Senior Camogie Championship Finals
All-Ireland Senior Camogie Championship Final
All-Ireland Senior Camogie Championship Final
All-Ireland Senior Camogie Championship Final
All-Ireland Senior Camogie Championship Final, 1979